2010 Ventforet Kofu season

Competitions

Player statistics

Other pages
 J. League official site

Ventforet Kofu
Ventforet Kofu seasons